A Good Catholic Girl is a 2010 Ugandan short film about a Muslim girl's attraction to someone from a different religious affiliation. It was written, produced and directed by Matt Bish. Matthew Nabwiso won the Best Supporting actor award at the 2013 Africa Magic Viewers Choice Awards for playing "Ahmed" in the film.

Plot
Ahmed (a villainous butcher played by Matthew Nabwiso) is interested in a strict Muslim customer's daughter yet she loves someone else, a lowly carpenter (role played by Joel Okuyo Atiku Prynce) who isn't Muslim, which is forbidden (Haram) in their religion. Ahmed tries to rape her, and when she resists, he kills her. But, her lover avenges her.

Cast 
Maureen Kulany as Amina
Joel Okuyo Atiku as Carpenter
Matthew Nabwiso as Ahmed
Brenda Ibarah as Madina 
Tibba Murungi as Amina's Friend
Sharon Amali as Amina's Friend
Cathy Masajjage as Mother
Herbert Kibirige as Father

Reception
The controversial film questions some Islamic ideologies and portrays religious tensions. It was included in Africa First: Volume Two, an anthology of five short films from new African filmmakers. Nabwiso scooped the Best Supporting Actor - Drama Award at the inaugural Africa Magic Viewers' Choice Awards (AMVCA) in Lagos, Nigeria in March 2013 beating four challengers: three Nigerians Osita Iheme, Fabian Adeoye Lojede and Kalu Ikeagwu plus South African Thomas Gumede. He was the only Ugandan nominee in the 26 category competition.

References

English-language Ugandan films
2010 films
Films directed by Matt Bish
2010 crime drama films
Ugandan drama films
2010s English-language films
Ugandan short films